The Islamic Azad University, Shiraz Branch (Danushgah-e Âzad-e Eslâmi-ye Vahed-e Shiraz) is a private university located in Shiraz, Iran. It is a part of private chain of universities in Iran called the Islamic Azad Universities.
The Islamic Azad University of Shiraz with over 290 faculty and academic staff, 82,000 square meters of educational space, 7,500 square meters of administration space, 15,200 square meters of sporting space, is the biggest private university in the southern region of Iran.

The headquarters of the Islamic Azad University is in Tehran, Iran. The Islamic Azad University was founded in 1982 and currently has an enrollment of 1.7 million students, 30,000 Alumni and 35,000 Administrators  making it the world's third largest. Over 3.5 million students have graduated from the Islamic Azad University since its establishment. Islamic Azad University has a total area of 16 million square meters  and over 440 branches across Iran and also in other countries around the world. It has also international branches and universities in the U.A.E, United Kingdom, Tanzania, Lebanon, Afghanistan and Armenia and has plans to establish more branch campuses in Malaysia, Canada, and Tajikistan in the near future.

Over the years, the university has accumulated assets estimated to be worth between $20 and $25 billion. The total area of the university is said to be 20 million square meters.
Some 4 million students have graduated from this university to this date, which has made it possible for a lot of people to get access to higher educations and better employment prospects. 
In the recent years a lot of effort has been made to expand the graduate studies at the Islamic Azad University. The Islamic Azad University has about 200,000 Master's Degree students and about 20,000 PhD level students.

The university system also operates a news agency similar to ANA, named "Azad News Agency".
Islamic Azad University's activities quickly expanded throughout the country, so that today thousands of students are enrolling every year. Not relying on government funding, it receives charitable donations and charges tuition fees.

The Islamic Azad University also operates some 617 schools throughout the country, these schools are known as SAMA.

The degrees and certificates issued by this university are recognized by the Ministry of Science and Higher Education. Post-graduate degrees have been offered in many different branches of Islamic Azad University.

History
Islamic Azad University of Shiraz is a private university located in Shiraz, Iran. It is a part of private chain of universities in Iran called the Islamic Azad Universities.
The Islamic Azad University of Shiraz was established in 1987 and it is the biggest Private University in southern part of Iran.
The Islamic Azad University of Shiraz was the first in offering many new and different degrees.  This university was the first in the southern part of Iran to offers a degree in Industrial Engineering . The Faculty of Art and Architecture of the university was also the first among other universities in Shiraz in offering a degree in Architecture, Music and Theater studies .
The Islamic Azad University is divided into different zones. The Shiraz branch is in the Zone One.

Today 
The Islamic Azad University of Shiraz was appointed as a comprehensive university in 2011. 
This university has over 290 faculty and academic staff members, with 82,000 square meters of educational space, 7,500 square meters of administration space, 15,200 square meters of sporting space.
Currently 17,000 students in different fields of studies and degrees study at this university. Degrees offered at this university include; Associate degrees (2 years), Bachelor's degrees (3, 4 or 5 years), Master's degrees (2 or 3 years), and Doctorate degrees ( 4 or 5 years).

Campuses 

The Islamic Azad University of Shiraz has four major campuses in the city of Shiraz and the neighbouring city of Sadra. Faculty of Art and Architecture is in the historic part of the city. The other three campuses are in the newly built city of Sadra, about 30 kilometers north west from Shiraz.

The newly built Pardis Campus is nearly 158 acres. The Pardis Campus is home to the Faculties of Engineering, Economics and Management, Agriculture and Chemistry.

Colleges and Faculties

Colleges bring together academics and students from a broad range of disciplines, and within each faculty or department within the university, academics from many different colleges can be found.
 Faculty of Arts and Architecture
 Department of Architecture
 Department of Painting
 Department of Music
 Department of Theater and Plays
 Faculty of Engineering
 Department of Industrial Engineering
 Department of Mechanical Engineering
 Department of Civil Engineering
 Department of Computer Engineering
 Department of Polymer Engineering
 Department of Metallurgy Engineering
 Department of Petroleum Engineering
 Faculty of Economics and Management
 Department of Industrial Management
 Department of Marketing Management
 Department of Insurance Management
 Department of Educational Management
 Department of Development and Planning
 Department of Industrial Economics
 Department of Marketing Economics
 Department of Economics Sciences
 Department of Accounting
 Faculty of Dentistry
 Faculty of Humanities and Social Sciences
 Department of Law
 Department of Persian Literature
 Department of Arabic Literature
 Department of English
 Department of Political Science
 Department of Philosophy
 Faculty of Sciences
 Department of Physics
 Department of Geography
 Department of Chemistry
 Department of Athletics
 Faculty of Agricultural Engineering
 Department of Water Engineering
 Department of Soil Sciences
 Department of Plant Diseases
 Department of Gardening Sciences

Student organisations 

There are several student organisations active throughout the university. These organisations are mainly concentrate on academic activities, with some also interested and active in political and social issues.

International Cooperation and Exchange
The Office of International Exchange Programs at the Islamic Azad University of Shiraz was established to provide students and faculty with exchange opportunities, including sending and hosting visiting scholars, aiding faculty members in arranging international study tours, developing exchange agreements with universities around the world.
The university has developed academic cooperation with several international universities including Tokyo University of Foreign Studies.

Academic year 

The academic year is divided into three academic terms, determined by the university and the ministry of higher education. The first academic term usually starts on 23 September. The second Academic term usually starts on 11 February, and the Summer term is usually started from 10 July.

International English Language Testing System (IELTS) 
From 2012, the Islamic Azad University of Shiraz is going to be the official test centre for IDP  IELTS Australia in the south of Iran.

See also 
 List of universities in Iran
 List of Universities of Fars Province
 List of Iranian Research Centers
 Higher education in Iran
 List of Iranian scientists from the pre-modern era.
 Modern Iranian scientists and engineers
 Education in Iran
 National Library of Iran
 Islamic Azad University, Estahban Branch

References

External links 
 Official website of Islamic Azad University of Shiraz 
 Official website of Islamic Azad University of Shiraz-Staff and Students Portal
 Official website of the Vice President for International Affairs, Islamic Azad University of Shiraz
 Official website for Seminars-Islamic Azad University of Shiraz
 ANA News Agency
 Portal of Computer Engineering Students-Islamic Azad University of Shiraz
 Portal of Industrial Engineering Students-Islamic Azad University of Shiraz 
 Islamic Azad University - UAE
 Islamic Azad University - Oxford

Shiraz, Islamic Azad University of
Buildings and structures in Shiraz
Education in Shiraz